Komal Gandhar ( Kōmal Gāndhār), also known as A Soft Note on a Sharp Scale, is a 1961 Bengali film written and directed by legendary film maker Ritwik Ghatak. The title refers to the Hindustani equivalent of "E-flat". It was part of the trilogy composed of Meghe Dhaka Tara (1960), Komal Gandhar and Subarnarekha (1962), all dealing with the aftermath of the Partition of India in 1947 and the refugees coping with it, though this was the most optimistic film of his oeuvre. The film explores three themes juxtaposed in the narrative: the dilemma of Anusuya, the lead character, the divided leadership of IPTA, and the fallout from the partition of India.

Overview
The title was taken from the line of a poem by Rabindranath Tagore that meant a sur or note, E-flat. As in other films by Ghatak, music plays a pivotal role in the movie.

Through the microcosmic perspectivising of a group of devoted and uncompromising IPTA workers, Ghatak with his signature style touches on varied issues of partition, idealism, corruption, the interdependence of art and life, the scope of art, and class-struggle. Unlike his other films, this one runs along an upbeat mood with the lead pair of lovers (Vrigu and Anusua) being reunited.

Cast
 Supriya Devi as Anusuya
 Abanish Bannerjee as Bhrigu
 Bijon Bhattacharya as Gagan
 Satindra Bhattacharya as Shibnath
 Debabrata Biswas
 Chitra Sen as Jaya
 Anil Chatterjee as Rishi
 Gyanesh Mukherjee
 Satyabrata Chattopadhyay
 Gita Dey as Shanta

Soundtrack
Music was by Jyotirindra Moitra, from IPTA, and a noted Rabindra Sangeet exponent who had previously given music in Ghatak's Meghe Dhaka Tara (1960), and had song by singers like, Bijon Bhattacharya, Debabrata Biswas, Hemanga Biswas. Bahadur Khan played sarod in the soundtrack. The film is noted for its wedding songs and also contrapuntal use of sound.

Screening of Komal Gandhar aka E-Flat in different festivals 
2017: Ritwik Ghatak Retrospective UK, at Dundee Contemporary Arts, Dundee, Scotland, UK, Programme curated by Sanghita Sen, Department of Film Studies, St Andrews University, UK

See also 
 List of works of Ritwik Ghatak

References

Citation

Notes

External links
 
 A Review by Erin O'Donnell

1961 films
Bengali-language Indian films
Films directed by Ritwik Ghatak
Films set in the partition of India
Indian black-and-white films
1960s Bengali-language films